A dipsogen is an agent that causes thirst. (From Greek: δίψα (dipsa), "thirst" and the suffix -gen, "to create".)

Physiology
Angiotensin II is thought to be a powerful dipsogen, and is one of the products of the renin–angiotensin pathway, a biological homeostatic mechanism for the regulation of electrolytes and water.

External links
 'Fluid Physiology' by Kerry Brandis (from http://www.anaesthesiamcq.com)

Physiology